E79 may refer to:
 European route E79
 King's Indian Defense, Encyclopaedia of Chess Openings code